Tuvalu competed at the 2009 World Championships in Athletics from 15–23 August. A team of 2 athletes was announced in preparation for the competition.

Results

Men

Women

References

External links
Entry list. European Athletic Association (2009-07-30). Retrieved on 2009-08-16.
Official competition website

Nations at the 2009 World Championships in Athletics
World Championships in Athletics
2009